The Piedrahita de Muñó Formation is an Early Cretaceous geologic formation of the Cameros Basin in northern Spain. Fossil theropod tracks have been reported from the formation. Also fossils of Lepidotes sp., Polacanthus sp. and Testudines indet. were found in the formation.

Correlation

See also 
 List of dinosaur-bearing rock formations
 List of stratigraphic units with theropod tracks

References

Bibliography

Further reading 
 X. Pereda Suberbiola, M. Meijide, F. Torcida, J. Welle, C. Fuentes, L. A. Izquierdo, D. Montero, G. Pérez, and V. Urién. 1999. Espinas dermicas del dinosaurio anquilosaurio Polacanthus en las facies Weald de Salas de los Infantes (Burgos, España) [Dermal spines of the ankylosaurian dinosaur Polacanthus in the Weald facies of Salas de los Infantes (Burgos, Spain)]. Estudios Geológicos 55:267-272
 

Geologic formations of Spain
Lower Cretaceous Series of Europe
Cretaceous Spain
Berriasian Stage
Valanginian Stage
Sandstone formations
Fluvial deposits
Ichnofossiliferous formations
Paleontology in Spain
Formations